The Otkhara cave complex is a group of caves at the foot of the Bzyb Range in Abkhazia, an entity in the South Caucasus with a disputed political status. It is located on a steep rock near the village of Otkhara, some 20 km northwest of the town of Gudauta. The caves are also known as those of Mchishta after a karst river effluxing from the base of the rock. The openings are at least partially artificial. Local legends and a scholarly hypothesis suggest religious use in the Middle Ages, but the exact function and timing remains unknown.

Description 
The cave entrances are located at the height of several metres above the ground surface and arranged in several tiers. They are rectangular in shape, ostensibly human-hewn, and faced by stones, joined together with lime mortar. Each of these caves is a narrow grotto of about 2 to 3 metres in width, but as high as 15 metres. Wooden details of rock-hewn openings have survived. According to local legends, the caves used to house a community of monks, but later it was used as a shelter for brigands. In the latter half of the 19th century, a nobleman from Otkhara, Mazhar Shervashidze, led a group of locals in an attempt to explore the caves. He was able to ascend the first tier and reportedly recovered a couple of silver objects, the subsequent fate of which is unknown. It was only in 1958 that the caves were first explored scientifically, by a group of specialists from Tbilisi with the help of rockclimbers. Several utensils of everyday use found in the caves are dated to the 13th–14th century.

References

External links  
Otkhara Cave Monastery Complex. Historical monuments of Abkhazia — Government of the Autonomous Republic of Abkhazia.

Religious buildings and structures in Georgia (country)
Religious buildings and structures in Abkhazia
Churches in Abkhazia
Caves of Abkhazia